Bob's is a Brazilian fast food chain, founded in 1952 by the American Brazilian tennis champion Bob Falkenburg, Wimbledon tournament winner in 1948. The first store was opened in the Copacabana neighborhood of Rio de Janeiro. It is the first Brazilian fast food chain.

In 1972, Falkenburg sold the franchise to the Brazilian Fast Food Corporation (BFFC).

Big Bob 
Among the main sandwiches sold by the company, Big Bob is the most popular and it is made of two hamburgers, onions and leaf chicory.

The chain also offers innovative sandwiches, as toasted cheese with banana sandwich. Another  popular item sold by the franchise is the Ovomaltine milkshake.

Business model
In 1984, Bob's started a franchising system, opening new stores in Vitória, Espírito Santo. Since then, Bob's has been expanding within Brazil and internationally. Today, there are about 811 stores in Brazil, of which about 320 are franchises. At one time, international stores were opened in Portugal (Carcavelos, Algés and Bragança) as well as in Chile and Angola, however since 2021 the company's website shows that they have closed.

Other brands
Bob's Shakes, formerly known as “Bob’s Sorvetes” (Bob's Ice Cream), sells frozen desserts such as ice cream, milkshakes, and pies. It was rebranded to the current name in 2009 due to increased popularity of its milkshakes (principally the Ovomaltine's) compared to ice cream.

Bexpress by Bob's offers half-finished and ready sandwiches to be heated in the oven, which can be eaten in or carried out.

See also
 List of hamburger restaurants

References

External links
 Official website

Fast-food chains of Brazil
Fast-food hamburger restaurants
Food and drink companies based in Rio de Janeiro (city)
Restaurants established in 1952
Brazilian brands
Hamburger restaurants
1952 establishments in Brazil